Thomas Matulessy (8 June 178316 December 1817), also known as Kapitan Pattimura or simply Pattimura, was a famous Ambonese soldier who became a symbol of both the Maluku and Indonesian struggle for independence, praised by President Sukarno and declared a national hero by President Suharto. He has several namesakes in both the Netherlands and in the Indonesian archipelago.

Born on the island of Ceram, Pattimura joined the British Colonial Auxiliary Forces after they took the Maluku islands from the French. When the islands were returned to the Dutch in 1816, he was dismissed. The return of the Dutch in 1816 marked a change in the colonial system. After the bankruptcy of the Dutch East India Company, the Indonesian archipelago came under the control of the newly founded Kingdom of the Netherlands. This was accompanied by, among other things, the establishment of a colonial army: KNIL. Christian Moluccans in particular were wanted as ethnic soldiers in the KNIL. Despite Pattimura's revolt, the myth of a centuries-long loyalty of Moluccans to the Netherlands and the royal family began.

Pattimura and his followers feared harsher colonial oppression than the English under whom he had served. On 16 May 1817 Pattimura led an armed rebellion that captured Fort Duurstede, killing the inhabitants of the fortress and fighting off Dutch reinforcements, on 29 May he was declared the leader of the Moluccan people. After being betrayed by the King of Booi Pati Akoon, he was captured by Dutch forces on 11 November and hanged the next month.

Biography
Pattimura was born Thomas Matulessy on 8 June 1783 in Seram, Maluku; the name Pattimura was his pseudonym. His parents were Frans Matulessia and Fransina Tilahoi, and he had a little brother named Yohanis. According to I.O.  Nanulaitta, quoted from Historia.id, Matulessia's family is a Protestant Christian. In 1810, the Maluku islands were taken over from the Napoleonic France by the British. Mattulessi received military training from their army and reached the rank of sergeant major.

After the signing of the Anglo-Dutch Treaty on 13 August 1814, in 1816 the Maluku islands were returned to the Dutch; Pattimura attended the ceremony. Afterwards, in violation of the treaty, he and his fellow soldiers were discharged to their hometowns. However, Pattimura refused to accept the restoration of Dutch power. He felt that they would stop paying native Christian teachers, as the French had done in 1810, and was concerned that a proposed switch to paper currency would leave the Maluku people unable to give alms — only coins were considered valid — and thus lead to churches being unable to help the poor.

Ambon revolt of 1817

He was appointed as Kapitan by the people of Saparua to rebel against the Dutch on 14 May 1817. The assault began on the 15th, with Pattimura and his lieutenants Said Perintah, Anthony Reebhok, Paulus Tiahahu and Tiahahu's daughter Martha Christina Tiahahu leading the way. On 16 May 1817, they seized Fort Duurstede and killed the 19 Dutch soldiers, Resident Johannes Rudolph van den Berg (who had arrived just two months earlier), his wife, three of his children and their governess. The only Dutch survivor was Van den Berg's five-year-old son Jean Lubbert. After the seizure, Pattimura's forces defended the fort and on May 20 defeated Major Beetjes, Second Lieutenant E. S. de Haas, and their nearly 200 troops, leaving only 30 survivors.
On 29 May, Pattimura and other Maluku leaders made the Haria Proclamation, which outlined their grievances against the Dutch government and declared Pattimura to be the leader of the Maluku people. In response, Governor-General Van der Cappellen immediately fired the governor of Ambon, Jacobus A. van Middelkoop, and his right hand, Nicolaus Engelhard, for their abuses of the local people.

On June 1, Pattimura led an unsuccessful attack on Fort Zeelandia in Haruku. Two months later, on August 3, Fort Duurstede was finally retaken by the Dutch, but the revolt had spread and was not subdued for another few months.

Due to betrayal from Booi's king, Pati Akoon, and Tuwanakotta, Pattimura was arrested on 11 November 1817 while he was in Siri Sori. He and his fellows were sentenced to death. On 16 December 1817, Pattimura together with Anthony Reebhok, Philip Latumahina, and Said Parintah were hanged in front of Fort Nieuw Victoria in Ambon.

Legacy

Pattimura and his war have been used as symbols for both Maluku independence, such as with the short-lived Republic of South Maluku, and Indonesian patriotism. The first president of Indonesia, Sukarno, considered Pattimura a great patriot.

In 1954, Sapija, an officer of the TNI, the Indonesian Army (Tentara Nasional Indonesia), published the book Sedjarah Perdjuangan Pattimura (History of the Battle of Pattimura). He had researched Matulessy's ancestry and discovered that his grandfather had carried the hereditary title Pattimura (patih: prince; murah: magnanimous). According to Dr. Dieter Bartels, anthropology professor in Yavapai College, Clarkdale, Arizona in the book Di Bawah Naungan Gunung Nunusaku (Under the Shade of Mount Nunusaku), oral history in Sahulau (Central Maluku) states that Mattulessy's ancestor used the title when they moved to Hulaliu so it is possible Mattulessy used the hereditary title. Although no contemporary written account attested Mattulessy used the title. On the authority of Johannes Latuharhary, Sapija and other Indonesian historians, Matulessy was declared a pahlawan nasional (national hero) in 1973 not under his name, but under the authoritative title Kapitan Pattimura. The name has since become common in both Indonesia and the Netherlands.
 
When Pattimura was awarded the title National Hero of Indonesia by President Suharto in 1973 through Presidential Decree number 87/TK, very little was written in independent Indonesia on this subject and he was virtually unknown outside Moluccan circles. How widely this interpretation can vary is perhaps most clearly indicated by the fact that both the Republik Maluku Selatan and the Republic of Indonesia put 
forward Pattimura as their Freedom Hero. In Ambon, he is commemorated in the names of the University of Pattimura, Pattimura Airport, and a street, as well as a statue; there are also streets named after him throughout the archipelago. In Wierden, the Netherlands, a street in the Moluccan neighborhood is named after Pattimura. 15 May is celebrated as Pattimura Day in the Netherlands and Indonesia. A similar, smaller holiday is held on 2 January to commemorate the younger Tiahahu. He is also featured on the 2000s series of the 1,000 Indonesian rupiah banknote.

References

Bibliography

 
 
 
 
 
 

1783 births
1817 deaths
Executed Indonesian people
Indonesian Christians
Indonesian Protestants
Moluccan people
National Heroes of Indonesia
People executed by the Netherlands by hanging
People from Maluku (province)
People from Saparua
People of the Indonesian National Revolution
Soldiers
19th-century Dutch East Indies people